Houstone School is a coeducational secondary school located in Houghton Regis in the English county of Bedfordshire.

History
The original school on this site was a community middle school administered by Central Bedfordshire Council, known as Kings Houghton Middle School. It converted to academy status on 1 September 2012 and was renamed Houghton Regis Academy. The school was sponsored by the Greenwood Academies Trust group of Academies.

From September 2013 the school began to change its age range, transitioning to become a secondary school. The school closed permanently in August 2022.

Houstone School is being constructed within the grounds of Houghton Regis Academy, as part of the wider Kingsland campus. The school building was set to open in 2022, however during construction of the new building Neolithic, Roman and Bronze Age remains were found, delaying completion. The school formally opened in September 2022, with pupils being temporarily located in the buildings of the former UTC Central Bedfordshire. The new school building is scheduled to open in Spring 2023.

The school today
Houstone School is a free school sponsored by the Advantage Schools Trust. Features of the school include a longer school day (8.25am to 4pm) and all pupils are taught a musical instrument from Year 7.

References

External links
Houstone School official website

Secondary schools in Central Bedfordshire District
Free schools in England